The Epps 1924 Monoplane was designed and built in 1924 by Ben T. Epps from Athens, Georgia.

1920s United States experimental aircraft
Aircraft first flown in 1924
Single-engined tractor aircraft
High-wing aircraft